The 1902–03 Bucknell Bison men's basketball team represented Bucknell University during the 1902–03 college men's basketball season. The team finished the season with an overall record of 10–0.

Schedule

|-

References

Bucknell Bison men's basketball seasons
Bucknell
Bucknell
Bucknell